del Lago (Italian), de Lago (Spanish), Delago, or variation, may refer to:

Places
 Castiglione del Lago, Perugia, Umbria, Italy
 Torre del Lago, Lucca, Tuscany, Italy
 Valle de Lago, Somledo, Asturias, Spain

Structures and facilities
 Plaza del Lago, Wilmette, Illinois, USA; a shopping center
 Del Lago Resort and Casino, Waterloo, New York State, USA

People
 Manu Delago (born 1984) Austrian musician
 Nicol Delago (born 1996) Italian skier

Animals
 Encosta De Lago (born 1993) Australian racehorse

See also
 La donna del lago (The Lady of the Lake) 1819 opera
 Lago (disambiguation)
 Del (disambiguation)
 De (disambiguation)